Kolešino is a village in the municipality of Novo Selo, North Macedonia.

History
In the past, at Kolesino lived Greek population.

Demographics
According to the 2002 census, the village had a total of 845 inhabitants. Ethnic groups in the village include:

Macedonians 838
Serbs 3
Others 4

People from Kolešino 

 Charalambos Boufidis, Greek chieftain of the Macedonian Struggle
 Pantelis Papaioannou, Greek chieftain of the Macedonian Struggle

References

Villages in Novo Selo Municipality